Floyd Robert Ross (born November 2, 1928) is an American former professional baseball player, a left-handed pitcher who appeared in Major League Baseball (MLB) for the Washington Senators (1950–51) and Philadelphia Phillies (1956).

Ross signed his first professional contract at age 16 with the Brooklyn Dodgers during 1945, the last year of World War II. After five seasons in the Dodger farm system, he was drafted by Washington and had six- and 11-game trials with the 1950 and 1951 Senators. He failed, however, to remain at the Major League level and spent at least part of each of his 13 professional seasons in the minor leagues. He missed the 1952 and 1953 seasons due to military service during the Korean War. Ross' final MLB trial came at the outset of the 1956 Phillies' season, but he appeared in only three games before being sent back to the minor leagues.

Ross appeared in 20 MLB games, and was winless in two decisions, giving up 55 hits and 38 bases on balls in 47 innings pitched, for a 1.95 walks plus hits per inning pitched.  He struck out 29 opposing batters.

References

External links

1928 births
Living people
Atlanta Crackers players
Baseball players from California
Chattanooga Lookouts players
Fort Worth Cats players
Kansas City Blues (baseball) players
Major League Baseball pitchers
Sportspeople from Fullerton, California
Philadelphia Phillies players
Pueblo Dodgers players
Sacramento Solons players
St. Paul Saints (AA) players
Santa Barbara Dodgers players
Thomasville Dodgers players
Wichita Braves players